Al Qous Club is a Saudi Arabian football club based in Al Khurmah, Mecca and competes in the Saudi Second Division, the third tier of Saudi football. The club was founded in 1984 and consists of various other departments including table tennis, volleyball, and weightlifting.

Al Qous earned their first promotion to the Second Division, the third tier of Saudi football, after finish first their group during the 2021–22 Third Division. They finished as runners-up after losing 2–1 in the final to Al-Suqoor.

Current squad 

As of 30 September 2022:

References

External links

Football clubs in Saudi Arabia
1984 establishments in Saudi Arabia
Association football clubs established in 1984